Laodicea undulata is a species of cnidarian of the family Laodiceidae described in 1853.

References

Leptothecata
Cnidarians of the Atlantic Ocean
Animals described in 1853